The Merry Wives is a 1938 Czechoslovak historical comedy film directed by Otakar Vávra.

Cast
 Zdeněk Štěpánek as Mikuláš Dačický of Heslov
 Ladislav Pešek as Očko
 Václav Vydra as Vilém of Vřesovice
 František Smolík as Alderman Tříska
 Jiřina Šejbalová as Žofie, Tříska's wife
 Theodor Pištěk as Vogt Vodňanský
 Antonie Nedošinská as Vodňanský's wife
 František Kreuzmann as Master Felix of Hasenburg
 Gustav Hilmar as Tailor Mládek
 Hana Vítová as Alžběta
 Adina Mandlová as Rozina

References

External links
 

1938 films
1938 comedy films
1930s historical comedy films
Czechoslovak comedy films
Czech historical comedy films
1930s Czech-language films
Czechoslovak black-and-white films
Films directed by Otakar Vávra
1930s Czech films